Bridget Perrier (born 1977) is an activist and former trafficked prostitute who cofounded Sex Trade 101 with Natasha Falle. She became a child prostitute at the age of 12 while she was staying at a group home and an older girl there persuaded her to become a runaway in order to sell sex to a pedophile named Charlie. She had a son, Tanner, who developed cancer as an infant and died at the age of five with the dying wish that his mother get out of the sex industry. In 2000, she moved to Toronto from Thunder Bay, Ontario, Canada. She is the stepmother of Angel, whose biological mother was Brenda Wolfe, one of Robert Pickton's murder victims. In 2009, Perrier accompanied Angel at Toronto's Native Women's Resource Centre for the Sisters in Spirit vigil in remembrance of Wolfe and the other more than 500 Canadian Aboriginal women who have been murdered or gone missing over the past 30 years. In 2010, Perrier picketed a courthouse in downtown Toronto in recognition of International Day of No Prostitution. She was joined by Trisha Baptie, Natasha Falle, Katarina MacLeod, and Christine Barkhouse, all former human trafficking victims. In 2012, after being removed from a news conference relating to Bedford v. Canada, Perrier demonstrated a pimp stick to the media, saying that she had been battered with a pimp stick by her pimp every day that he prostituted her. Perrier opposed the legalization of brothels as proposed in Bedford v. Canada, saying, "Having a legal bawdy house is not going to make it any safer. You are still going to attract serial killers, rapists, perverts."  Bridget shared her story in the ground breaking article by Dr. Vincent J. Felitti in Cancer InCytes magazine (Volume 2, Issue 1) about how childhood trauma is associated with chronic diseases during adulthood, and how child trafficking will eventually worsen the economic burden on civil governance.

References

Living people
1977 births
Anti-prostitution feminists
Canadian human rights activists
Women human rights activists
Canadian female prostitutes
Human trafficking in Canada
People from Thunder Bay
Activists from Toronto
Canadian victims of crime
Sexual abuse victim advocates
Sexual harassment in Canada
Forced prostitution
Child prostitution
Anti-pedophile activism
Victims of underage prostitution